Wahabpora is a village in district Budgam in Indian administered union territory of Jammu and Kashmir, India. The village Wahabpora consists of about six mohallahs— Peer Mohallah (Mosvey Abad), Taingapora, Watipora, Ganaiepora, New Colony and Chinar colony.
It is necessary to describe that Chinar colony was a part of Mosviabad and Al-Mehdi Chowk is the famous region of  Chinar colony, the colony which is the central part of the village where five big chinars, about the age five hundred years old are present. The brother in law of Mughal King Jahangir and that time Governor of Kashmir Asif Khan had planted these five chinars. Chinar Garden of Wahabpora is also known as “Asif Ali Khan Bagh”. Gariend is the neighbouring village to Wahabpora. Famous plane crushing event occurred near this place is also known as Gariend-Wahabpora plane crashing event-2019.

Geography
It contains  of total land. This village consists of many sects of Islam like as Shias, Sunnis and Noorbakshia Islam . Literacy rate of this village is 91.90%.

Al-Mehdi Chowk 

Al-Mehdi Chowk is the central part of Wahabpora. This area is named after 12th Shia Imam Imam Mahdi. This area consists of head offices of many organisations like as Almehdi Islamic Library, Raheislam Organisation, Ali Asgar a.s. Relief Trust, JK Bank Khidmat Centre, Mosvi Computers, Mosiviyat Enclave, Mosvey Abad and Matam-Sarai Asadshah Peermohlla.  Mosvey Cemetery is also located in this region. This area playing an important role for economy and culture of the village. It is called the Business Hub of Wahabpora. It is also the centre of Islam Naab.

Mosviyat Enclave
Mosviyat Enclave is the official residence of Patron of Raheislam Organisation and Mosvi Youth Club located at Almehdi Chowk, Mosviabad, Wahabpora.

Wahabpora

Meaning of Wahabpora

The name Wahabpora is made of two words:
Wahab and Pora, Wahab is a name of Allah which means provider or one who gives and in common language Pora is used to indicate any region, village or town. So Wahabpora means region of providers which provides humanitarian services to all.

Shrine of Aga Mir Mosavi
In this village there is a shrine situated near the main bus stand. A renowned scholar and a'alim Aga Mir Syed Mohammad Baqir Mosavi is buried here. The shrine is surrounded with cemented wall and the colour of the shrine is dark green. Famous marsiya khani Astan Bandar is held here.

Schools 
 Government Higher Secondary School, Wahabpora
 Government Primary Boys School, Wahabpora
 Government Primary Girls School, Wahabpora
 Imamia Public High School, Wahabpora
 Geo Professional School, Wahabpora
 Raheislam Educational Organisation, Wahabpora
 Tanzeemul Makatib A, B and C, Wahabpora

Religious organisations 
 Raheislam Organisation and Library
 Idarah Islamia Al-Mehdi a.s. and Library
 Ali Asgar a.s. Relief Trust and Blood Bank
 Hussaini a.s. Relief Committee
 Al-Asr a.s Relief Committee
 Markazi Waqk Committee

Festivals 
Many Majlis and festivals are celebrated here like as Nauroz, Ashoora, Sham-i-Ghareban, Eid-ul-Fitr, Eid-ul-Azha, Eid-i-Ghadeer, Shab-e-Meraj and Astan Bandar etc. Wahabpora is famous for the annual marsiya khani Astan Bandar.

Telecom services 
This village is connected through the telecom services to the entire world. Airtel, Bsnl, Vodafone-Idea, and Reliance Jio are the main telecom service providers in this area. On 21 February 2018 Aircel stopped its services in the whole country. The local subscribers also affected in this village.

Transport
Wahabpora is connected through roads via Budgam, Magam, Bemina, Srinagar and Beerwah.

Railway
The nearest railway station is at Budgam Budgam Railway Station.

Airport
The nearest airport is Srinagar International Airport.

Stadium
The Maidan Stadium is Wahabpora's biggest sports venue. It was modelled by cutting down at least 100 wallnut trees.

Profession data

Gallery

External links

References

Villages in Budgam district